Nottingham Township is one of the fifteen townships of Harrison County, Ohio, United States. As of the 2010 census the population was 324, down from 392 at the 2000 census.

Geography
Located in the south central part of the county, it borders the following townships:
Stock Township - north
Cadiz Township - east
Moorefield Township - south
Franklin Township - west
Washington Township - northwest

No municipalities are located in Nottingham Township.

Name and history
It is the only Nottingham Township statewide.

Government
The township is governed by a three-member board of trustees, who are elected in November of odd-numbered years to a four-year term beginning on the following January 1. Two are elected in the year after the presidential election and one is elected in the year before it. There is also an elected township fiscal officer, who serves a four-year term beginning on April 1 of the year after the election, which is held in November of the year before the presidential election. Vacancies in the fiscal officership or on the board of trustees are filled by the remaining trustees.

References

External links
County website

Townships in Harrison County, Ohio
Townships in Ohio
English-American culture in Ohio